Héctor Monterroso Gonzales is an Anglican bishop. Originally from Guatemala, he became bishop of Costa Rica in 2003. In 2017, he became assistant bishop in the Episcopal Diocese of Texas.

References 

Living people
Year of birth missing (living people)
21st-century Costa Rican Anglican bishops
Anglican bishops of Costa Rica
Guatemalan bishops
Episcopal bishops of Texas
21st-century American clergy